Live In New Orleans is the first live album and fifth overall album by  Bay Area-based R&B group Maze.  Recorded live at Saenger Theatre in New Orleans, Louisiana November 14–15, 1980. With four new tracks recorded at The Automatt in San Francisco, California.

Track listing
All songs written by Frankie Beverly.

"Introduction"       0:30
"You"            5:54
"Changing Times" 	5:11 	
"Joy and Pain" 	9:45 
"Happy Feelings"	   5:28
"Southern Girl" 	6:22 	
"Look at California" 	11:00 	
"Feel That You're Feelin'" 	9:48 	
"The Look in Your Eyes" 	7:22 	
"Running Away" 	5:56 	
"Before I Let Go" 	5:07 	
"We Need Love to Live" 	4:50 	
"Reason" 	5:04

"Running Away", "Before I Let Go", "We Need Love to Live" and "Reason" are studio tracks.  The original 2-LP set contained 13 tracks.  When it was issued on CD, it was amended to fit on one CD.  Therefore, "Introduction," "You," and "Happy Feelings" were omitted from the CD version.

Charts

Singles

References

External links
 Maze Featuring Frankie Beverly -Live In New Orleans at Discogs

1981 live albums
Maze (band) albums
Capitol Records live albums
Live soul albums
Live funk albums